Cristina Barcellini (born 20 November 1986) is a retired Italian female volleyball player.

She was part of the Italy women's national volleyball team at the 2009 FIVB Women's World Grand Champions Cup, and at the 2010 FIVB Volleyball Women's World Championship in Japan. She played with Asystel Novara.

Clubs
  Asystel Novara (2010)

References

External links
 

1986 births
Living people
People from Novara
Italian women's volleyball players
Universiade medalists in volleyball
Competitors at the 2013 Mediterranean Games
Mediterranean Games gold medalists for Italy
Mediterranean Games medalists in volleyball
Universiade gold medalists for Italy
Medalists at the 2009 Summer Universiade
Sportspeople from the Province of Novara